Abmal (also Romanized as Ābmāl; also known as Oomal, Ow Māl, and Ūmāl) is a village in Rudpey-ye Shomali Rural District, in the Central District of Sari County, Mazandaran Province, Iran. At the 2006 census, its population was 599, in 153 families.

References 

Populated places in Sari County